Odalguri (also spelt Udalguri) is a town and the headquarters of Udalguri district under the jurisdiction of Bodoland Territorial Council which controls the Bodoland Territorial Area Districts in the state of Assam.

Geography 

Demographics
 

As per 2011 census, population of Odalguri town was 15,279. Literacy rate of Odalguri town was 88.33%.

Language

Assamese is the most spoken language at 7,590 speakers, followed by Bengali at 2,598, Bodo is spoken by 2,440 people and Hindi at 1,405.

Transport
Udalguri is the main railway station of Odalgiri town. Udalguri railway station is a railway station on Rangiya–Murkongselek section under Rangiya railway division of Northeast Frontier Railway zone.

Politics 
Odalguri is part of Mangaldoi (Lok Sabha constituency).

References

External links 
 Official Website of Udalguri District

 

as:ওদালগুৰি জিলা